Gauthier de Tessières (born 9 November 1981) is a World Cup alpine ski racer from France, and has competed in two Winter Olympics and five World Championships. He made his breakthrough on the Alpine Skiing World Cup in a giant slalom in Val-d'Isère in December 2008, where after finishing 30th in the first run to narrowly qualify for the second run, he worked his way up to finish third overall, bettering his previous World Cup personal best of 15th. He won the silver medal in the super-G at the 2013 World Championships, after being added to the French team as an injury replacement. De Tessières announced his retirement from competition in January 2014 after he was not selected for the 2014 Winter Olympics.

World Cup results

Top ten finishes
 1 podium – (1 GS) 
 5 top tens

Season standings

References

External links
 
 Gauthier de Tessières World Cup standings at the International Ski Federation
 
 
 French Ski Team – 2013 men's A team – 
 Head Skis – team – athletes – Gauthier de Tessières

1981 births
French male alpine skiers
Alpine skiers at the 2006 Winter Olympics
Alpine skiers at the 2010 Winter Olympics
Olympic alpine skiers of France
Sportspeople from Clermont-Ferrand
Living people